Nuestra Belleza Oaxaca 2011,  was held in the Teatro Macedonio Alcalá in Oaxaca, Oaxaca on June 3, 2011. At the conclusion of the final night of competition, Teresa Raviela of Río Grande was crowned the winner. Raviela was crowned by outgoing Nuestra Belleza Oaxaca titleholder, Alejandra Scherenberg. Six contestants competed for the title.

Results

Placements

Special Awards

Judges
Ofelia Correa - National Coordinator of Nuestra Belleza México
Luis Moya - Dermatologist
Jordie Avendaño - Photographer
James Preston - Actor

Background Music
Motel

Contestants

Contestant Notes
Mariana Mejía also she was 1st Runner-up in Nuestra Belleza Oaxaca 2010. She was elected as Miss Earth Oaxaca 2011 in a private casting with expectations to participate in Miss Earth México 2011 but for different reasons she will not compete, taking place Alejandra Sandoval Villaseñor.
Samantha Antonio will compete in Nuestra Belleza Oaxaca 2012.

References

External links
Official Website

Nuestra Belleza México